William Canfield was an actor on stage and screen known for portraying villains. He was in the 1915 serial The Broken Coin and the 1918 war propaganda film Why America Will Win.

Filmography
The Little Girl of the Attic (1915)
Across the Rio Grande (1915)
The Broken Coin (1915) as Gorgas the Outlaw
A Knight of the Range (1916) as Gentleman Dick
The Stampede in the Night (1916)
Lee Blount Goes Home (1916)
The Wedding Guest (1916)
The Shadow (1916 film)
The Woman He Feared (1916)
Gloriana (1916)
The Devil's Bandwagon (1916)
Cross Purposes (1916) as The Grand Duke
Love Never Dies (1916)
The Voice on the Wire (1917) as William Grimsby
Why America Will Win (1918)
Berlin Via America (1918), a serial

References

Year of birth missing
Year of death missing